Postalesio (Lombard: Pustalés) is a comune (municipality) in the Province of Sondrio in the Italian region Lombardy, located about  northeast of Milan and about  west of Sondrio.

Postalesio borders the following municipalities: Berbenno di Valtellina, Caiolo, Castione Andevenno, Cedrasco, Fusine, Torre di Santa Maria.

Demographic evolution

References

External links
 www.comune.postalesio.so.it

Cities and towns in Lombardy